Ernest Mabouka (born 16 June 1988) is a Cameroonian professional footballer who plays as a right-back for Israeli Premier League club Hapoel Nof HaGalil.

Club career

Žilina
Mabouka made his debut for MŠK Žilina against Tatran Liptovský Mikuláš in the 2nd leg of the 2010–11 Slovakian Cup quarterfinals.

Maccabi Haifa
Mabouka signed for Maccabi Haifa on 9 July 2017. On 4 November 2019, he scored his first goal for Maccabi Haifa, the winning goal in the 92nd minute in a 2–1 win over Hapoel Tel Aviv.

On 30 May 2021, he won the Israeli Premier League championship. Mabouka became a free agent after Maccabi Haifa chose to not renew his contract at the end of the season.

International career
Mabouka was called up to the Cameroon national team for the 2017 Africa Cup of Nations. He made his debut in a pre-tournament friendly win 2–0 against the DR Congo on 5 January 2017.

Honours
MŠK Žilina
Fortuna Liga: 2016–17

Maccabi Haifa
 Israeli Premier League: 2020–21

Cameroon
Africa Cup of Nations: 2017

References

External links
MŠK Žilina profile

1988 births
Living people
Footballers from Douala
Cameroonian footballers
MŠK Žilina players
Maccabi Haifa F.C. players
Hapoel Nof HaGalil F.C. players
Slovak Super Liga players
Israeli Premier League players
Cameroon international footballers
Cameroonian expatriate footballers
Expatriate footballers in Slovakia
Expatriate footballers in Israel
Cameroonian expatriate sportspeople in Slovakia
Cameroonian expatriate sportspeople in Israel
Africa Cup of Nations-winning players
2017 Africa Cup of Nations players
2017 FIFA Confederations Cup players
Association football fullbacks